Ballarpur Assembly constituency is one of the 288 Vidhan Sabha (legislative assembly) constituencies of Maharashtra state, western India. This constituency is located in Chandrapur district. The delimitation of the constituency happened in 2008.

Geographical scope
The constituency comprises Mul taluka, Pombhurna taluka, Ballarpur taluka, and parts of Chandrapur taluka viz. revenue circles - Chandrapur Chandrapur Rayatwari.

Members of Legislative Assembly

References

Assembly constituencies of Maharashtra